Leonard Crosse (died 1610) of Wells, Somerset, was an English politician.

Family
Crosse was married with three sons and two daughters.

Career
Crosse was Mayor of Wells in 1590. He was a Member (MP) of the Parliament of England for Wells in 1597.

References

16th-century births
1610 deaths
English MPs 1597–1598
Mayors of Wells, Somerset